Lucky Lake Airport,  is located adjacent to Lucky Lake, Saskatchewan, Canada.

Planning for a new airport began in 1988, and Transport Canada gave $500,000 in funding to construct a  paved runway and taxiway, paved / gravel apron, gravel access road and parking lot, and perimeter fencing; to install airport lighting, beacon, and lighted windsock (for night operations); and to provide utilities to the site. This would replace the unlit grass strip previously in operation. There was much support from the community, and in 1991, the Federal Minister of Transport officially announced that construction could begin. Companies from Swift Current were hired to construct the airport, and in 1993, construction began. The official opening of the airport took place on July 30, 1994, which was also the village of Lucky Lake's 75th anniversary.

See also 
List of airports in Saskatchewan

References

External links 
 Page about this airport on COPA's Places to Fly airport directory

Registered aerodromes in Saskatchewan
Canaan No. 225, Saskatchewan